Henry Walker (3 October 1807 – 7 November 1872) was an English cricketer.

He was born in Southgate and played first-class cricket between 1832 and 1841, mainly for Marylebone Cricket Club (MCC). His seven nephews (the Walkers of Southgate) also played first-class cricket.

External links 

1807 births
1872 deaths
English cricketers
People from Southgate, London
English cricketers of 1826 to 1863
Marylebone Cricket Club cricketers
Gentlemen cricketers
Gentlemen of England cricketers
Henry
Cricketers from Greater London